Condamine Power Station is a 140 MW combined cycle power station near Miles on the western Darling Downs in Queensland, Australia. The Condamine Power Station is owned by QGC Limited, a subsidiary of Royal Dutch Shell. It has been claimed to be the world’s first combined-cycle power station entirely fired by untreated coal seam gas and Australia's first steam turbine condenser cooled by coal seam methane waste water. However, the Townsville Power Station at Yabulu, which was converted from a peak load power station to burn only coal seam gas in a combined cycle configuration, was commissioned much earlier, in February 2005.

Construction began on 19 October 2007. It was completed in mid-2010.  The EPC contractor was Austrian Energy and Environment with the gas turbines supplied by Siemens. Parsons Brinckerhoff were the owner's engineer for construction.  The gas turbine with dispatchable unit ID (DUID) "CPSA" began bidding into the National Electricity Market on 1 June 2009, with the first generation made available to the market on 10 July 2009. The Columboola Switching Station, which connects Condamine Power Station with the Chinchilla-to-Roma 132-kilovolt
transmission line, was completed in October 2008.

AGL Energy had an option to acquire the Condamine Power Station. This option was not exercised and expired on 14 April 2009.

The power station has installed capacity of 140 MW.  
Electricity is generated by two gas turbines and one steam turbine from coal seam gas. The two gas turbines are Siemens SGT-800 models and the steam turbine is a Siemens SST-400. According to the NEMMCO Applicants list, the registered capacity of the gas turbine is 87.4 MW (2 x 43.7 MW) and the registered capacity of the steam turbine is 57.1 MW.

The gas reserves are extracted from the Berwyndale South Gasfield. Building the plant directly on top of the gas source will provide some of the cheapest gas-fired electricity to the National Electricity Market.

See also

List of active power stations in Queensland

References

Natural gas-fired power stations in Queensland
Darling Downs
Energy infrastructure completed in 2010